The Confederation of Independent Football Associations (CONIFA) is the international governing body for association football teams that are not affiliated with FIFA.

Competitions

Women's football 
All members of CONIFA are encouraged to invest in women's football in their communities, and to create female national selections to play and compete against other CONIFA members.

CONIFA's first ever official women's football match took place on 10 November 2018 in Northern Cyprus, with Sápmi ladies beating their Northern Cypriot hosts 4–0 in the Women's Friendship Cup. CONIFA announced their first Women's World Football Cup on 31 January 2021, to be hosted by Székely Land between 23 and 30 June 2021 and involve 6 teams.

Men's 
 CONIFA World Football Cup
 CONIFA European Football Cup
 CONIFA Africa Football Cup
 CONIFA South America Football Cup
 CONIFA No Limits European Championship
 CONIFA Asian Football Cup

Women's 
 CONIFA Women's World Football Cup

Futsal 
 CONIFA No Limits Mediterranean Futsal Cup

National leagues sanctioned by CONIFA 
 Liga de Balompié Mexicano

Current title holders

Members

Types of members 
CONIFA expressly uses the term "members" rather than "countries" or "states". A football association may be eligible to apply for membership of CONIFA if it, or the entity (ethnic and/or linguistic minority, indigenous group, cultural organization, territory) it represents, is not a member of FIFA and satisfies one or more of the following criteria: 
The football association is a member of one of the six continental confederations of FIFA, which are: AFC, CAF, CONCACAF, CONMEBOL, OFC, UEFA.
The entity represented by the football association is a member of the International Olympic Committee. 
The entity represented by the football association is a member of one of the member federations of Association of IOC Recognised International Sports Federations (ARISF).
The entity represented by the football association is in possession of an ISO 3166-1 country code. 
The entity represented by the football association is a de facto independent territory. A territory is considered de facto independent if it meets all of the following criteria: (a) a well-defined territory; (b) a permanent population; (c) an autonomous government, and (d) diplomatic recognition by at least one of the member states of the United Nations. 
The entity represented by the football association is included on the United Nations list of non-self-governing territories.
The entity represented by the football association is included in the directory of countries and territories of the Travelers' Century Club. 
The entity represented by the football association is a member of the Unrepresented Nations and Peoples Organization (UNPO) and/or the Federal Union of European Nationalities (FUEN). 
The entity represented by the football association is a minority included in the World Directory of Minorities and Indigenous Peoples, maintained and published by Minority Rights Group International. 
The entity represented by the football association is a linguistic minority, the language of which is included on the List of ISO 639-2 codes.

List of members 
As of

Important personalities

Presidency

Vice-Presidents of ConIFA

General Secretaries

Africa President

Asian President

European President

Latin America President

North American and Caribbean President

Oceanian President

Directors of Women’s Football

See also 
Non-FIFA international football
New Football Federations-Board 
World Unity Football Alliance – Several CONIFA members also hold membership of the WUFA.
CONIFA World Football Cup
CONIFA European Football Cup

References

External links 
 

 
Association football governing bodies
Sports organizations established in 2013